Charlie Borders is a former Republican member of the Kentucky State Senate from January 1991 until his resignation in July 2009.

Borders, who attended Morehead State University, works in real estate in Greenup, Kentucky.

In 2009, Borders resigned from his legislative post to become a member of Kentucky's Public Service Commission. A special election was called to replace him, and Democratic candidate Robin L. Webb won.

References

Sources
article on Borders

Living people
Kentucky state senators
Year of birth missing (living people)